Dance Me to My Song is a 1998 Australian drama film directed by Rolf de Heer. It was entered into the 1998 Cannes Film Festival. The film grossed $175,138 at the box office in Australia.  Heather Rose described her intention to make the screenplay "not just another soppy disability film".  Roger Ebert described the film as one where "the human will and spirit overwhelm you".  David Stratton describes the film as "a warm, positive, affirmation of life".  An article in Australian Feminist Studies discusses the film in the genre of women's films.

Cast
 John Brumpton as Eddie
 Danny Cowles as Joe
 Catherine Fitzgerald as Dogface
 Susie Fraser as Social Worker
 Carmel Johnson as Temporary Carer
 Joey Kennedy as Madelaine
 Phil MacPherson as Trev
 Rena Owen as Rix
 Heather Rose as Julia

References

External links

Dance Me to My Song at Oz Movies

1998 films
1998 drama films
Australian drama films
Films directed by Rolf de Heer
Films about people with cerebral palsy
1990s English-language films
1990s Australian films